Cristian Ionuț Costin (born 17 June 1998) is a Romanian professional footballer who plays as a right back or right midfielder for Liga I side FC Voluntari. In his career Costin also played for teams such as UTA Arad and CSM Reșița.

Career Statistics

Club

Honours

Club
FC Voluntari
Cupa României runner-up: 2021–22

References

External links
 
 

1998 births
Living people
People from Beclean
Romanian footballers
Association football midfielders
Liga I players
FC Voluntari players
Liga II players
Liga III players
FC UTA Arad players
CSM Reșița players